Marianne Hefti (born 29 May 1953) is a retired Swiss alpine skier who competed in the 1972 Winter Olympics.

External links
 sports-reference.com
 

1953 births
Living people
Swiss female alpine skiers
Olympic alpine skiers of Switzerland
Alpine skiers at the 1972 Winter Olympics
Place of birth missing (living people)
20th-century Swiss women